Cruach nam Miseag is a mountain near Lochgoilhead within the Arrochar Alps, Scotland. It reaches a height of 606 m (1989 ft).

References

 https://web.archive.org/web/20110719132548/http://www.mountaindays.net/mountains/peak.php?defn=0&area=79&peak=1435
 http://www.go4awalk.com/mountains/scottishmtns.php?mtn=21283

Mountains and hills of Argyll and Bute
Marilyns of Scotland